Chris Bright (born october 14, 1970) is a Canadian-born Japanese former professional ice hockey player. He was selected by the Hartford Whalers in the fourth round (78th overall) of the 1990 NHL Entry Draft.

Career statistics

International career
Bright competed at the 1995 Men's World Ice Hockey Championships as a member of the Canada men's national ice hockey team coached by Tom Renney.
Bright competed at the 2004 Men's World Ice Hockey Championships as a member of the Japan men's national ice hockey team coached by Mark Mahon.

References

External links

1970 births
Living people
Canadian expatriate sportspeople in Japan
Canadian ice hockey right wingers
EHC Basel players
Frankfurt Lions players
Hannover Scorpions players
Hartford Whalers draft picks
HK Acroni Jesenice players
Ice hockey people from Ontario
Japanese ice hockey players
Louisville Icehawks players
Moose Jaw Warriors players
Rochester Americans players
South Carolina Stingrays players
Sportspeople from Guelph
Springfield Indians players
Worcester IceCats players